Pedro Rafael Félix Alves (born 27 May 1983 in Lisbon) is a Portuguese former professional footballer who played as a midfielder.

References

External links

1983 births
Living people
Footballers from Lisbon
Portuguese footballers
Association football midfielders
Liga Portugal 2 players
Segunda Divisão players
Louletano D.C. players
Clube Oriental de Lisboa players
C.D. Pinhalnovense players
S.U. Sintrense players
S.C.U. Torreense players
Cypriot Second Division players
Aris Limassol FC players
Portuguese expatriate footballers
Expatriate footballers in Cyprus
Portuguese expatriate sportspeople in Cyprus